Compadre Records is a Houston-based independent record label that specializes in roots music. Compadre's artists include Billy Joe Shaver, Honeybrowne, Suzy Bogguss, Flaco Jimenez, James McMurtry, Trent Willmon, Hayes Carll, among others. Compadre has also released a successful series of Texas music compilations (Brewed in Texas; Texas Road Trip; Texas Outlaws; Brewed in Texas 2; Let's Step Outside).

It was purchased in 2007 by Mathew Knowles' company, Music World Entertainment.

See also
 List of record labels

References 

American country music record labels
Record labels established in 2001
American independent record labels